The 2009 PBA Fiesta Conference Finals was the best-of-7 championship series of the 2009 PBA Fiesta Conference and the conclusion of the conference's playoffs. The series was a best-of-seven affair and was the 97th championship disputed in the league. The teams competing are first-seed San Miguel Beermen and the second-seed defending champions Barangay Ginebra Kings, two of the three San Miguel Corporation-owned teams.

This was the fourth time the two teams meet in the finals, with San Miguel winning their first two meetings (1989 Reinforced Conference and the 2001 All Filipino Cup). Barangay Ginebra won their latest finals meeting on the conclusion of the 2006–07 PBA Philippine Cup.

This was also the first time in PBA history that a champion of the previous year's Fiesta Conference was able to enter the finals to defend their crown.

After a full 7-game series, San Miguel held off Ginebra in game 7 with an emphatic 90–79 win, with Jonas Villanueva awarded as the Finals MVP.

Background

Road to the finals

Series summary

Game 1

Game 2

With just a few seconds before the game ended, and with a San Miguel win certain, San Miguel players Danny Ildefonso and Marc Pingris were involved with an altercation with a Ginebra fan. Both men were suspended for one game and were fined P30,000 and P10,000 respectively.

Game 3

The Kings, after falling behind by 12 points, outscored the Beermen by 11 points in the third quarter and another 15 points in the final quarter to have a come-from-behind victory to take the series lead. Noel had a triple double and had key plays during the decisive Ginebra run.

Game 4

A close game all-throughout with as many as 18 deadlocks in between, Freeman converted a three-point play to increase San Miguel's lead to five; SMB led by as much as 8 in the final two minutes when Ginebra had another run. Eric Menk and Chico Lanete scored to cut the lead to two. Noel tied the ballgame after shooting two free throws off a foul from San Miguel, but Freeman scored on a put-back off Mike Cortez's miss. With less than 30 seconds left, Freeman fouled Noel beyond the three-point line on the act of shooting; Noel missed all of this free-throws, and San Miguel hung on to tie the series 2–2.

Game 5

The fifth game of the series was rescheduled to July 13 since the Araneta Coliseum was not available due to a WWE event on July 10 and a UAAP doubleheader on July 12.

Game 6

Game 7

Rosters

Broadcast notes
The finals is the second championship series of  The PBA on C/S.

References

External links
PBA official website

2009
2008–09 PBA season
San Miguel Beermen games
Barangay Ginebra San Miguel games
PBA Fiesta Conference Finals